Chryseobacterium is a genus of Gram-negative bacteria. Chryseobacterium species are chemoorganotrophic, rod shape gram-negative bacteria. Chryseobacterium form typical yellow-orange color colonies due to flexirubin-type pigment. The genus contains more than 100 described species from diverse habitats, including freshwater sources, soil, marine fish, and human hosts.

History 
The genus Chryseobacterium was originally created in 1994 by Vandamme et al. for six bacterial taxa that, at that time, were classified as members of the genus Flavobacterium: F. balustinum, F. indologenes, F. gleum, F. meningosepticum, F. indoltheticum, and F. scophthalmum. In 2005 an additional genus, Elizabethkingia, was created for two species within the genus Chryseobacterium; namely, C. meningosepticum and C. miricola. In 2002 standards and guidelines for description of novel taxa in the family of Flavobacteriaceae were published by Bernardet et al. By 2006, the genus Chryseobacterium had expanded to 10 species, by 2014 more than 60 species and currently more than 100.

Ecology 
Chryseobacterium spp. were recovered from soils, plant roots, flowers, decaying plant material and maple sap. Some plant-associated Chryseobacterium strains are able to inhibit plant pathogenic fungi. Chryseobacterium spp. were also recovered from freshwater creeks, lakes, their sediments, water cooling systems, drinking water, lactic acid beverages, beer bottling plants, bioreactor sludge, polluted soil, marine sediment and permafrost. Chryseobacterium spp. are associated with a multitude of animals - they have been detected in the midgut of mosquitos, within cockroach guts, millipede feces, and penguin guano, gut homogenates of freshwater copepods, bird feathers, cow's milk, raw meats and chicken. Chryseobacterium spp. were recovered from the mucus of apparently healthy fish, however sometimes they are considered as a spoilage organism. Three novel cold-tolerant species of Chryseobacterium, C. oranimense C. haifense, and C. bovis, have been detected in raw milk in Israel.

Pathogenesis 
The most pathogenic Flavobacterium spp., Chryseobacterium meningosepticum, which caused numerous infections, was reclassified to the genus Elizabethkingia. Chryseobacterium indologenes although ubiquitous in nature, mainly found in soil and water, is an uncommon human pathogen. However, in rare cases it can cause serious infections, particularly among the immunocompromised. Most of the time infections are hospital acquired, often associated with immunosuppression or indwelling catheters. It has been reported as the causative agent in bacteremia, peritonitis, pneumonia, empyema, pyelonephritis, cystitis, meningitis and central venous catheter-associated infections. The numbers of reported C. indologenes infections are increasing. The majority of reported infections have been from Taiwan and only about 10% have been outside of Asia. A few reports have come from Australia, India, Europe and the USA. C. indologenes is also pathogenic to the soft tick, whereas other Chryseobacterium spp. were recovered from diseased turtles, frogs and fish, in particularly C. scophthalmum, C. joostei, C. piscicola, C. chaponense, C. viscerum and C. oncorhynchi, C. aahli, C. hominis, C. shigense as well as C. indologenes which is associated with human diseases.

Certain Chryseobacterium species were reported as having unusual matrix digesting properties, being able to degrade most difficult collagenous matrices, such as feathers or exoskeletons. These properties are likely mediated through the action of specific chitinases and collagenase-like metalloproteases. Some of the species, such as Chryseobacterium nematophagum were shown to be able to infect, kill and ultimately consume all nematode tissues, including the normally highly insoluble cuticular exoskeleton. Chitinase, gelatinase and collagenase metalloprotease activities have been linked to Chryseobacterium gliding motility exerted through type IX secretion systems. Indeed, some of these enzymes possess C-terminal type IX secretion signals. Chryseobacterium themselves have neither collagen nor chitin proteins or structures. Chryseobacterium species belong to the Bacteriodetes phylum, members of which are being increasingly describes as having unusually linked motility and secretory system.

Botulinum neurotoxin-like (BoNT-like) toxins were detected in the genome of Chryseobacterium piperi str. CTM and they present a highly divergent group of BoNT-like toxins. One of the predicted C. piperi BoNT-like toxins induced necrotic cell death in human kidney cells, but was not found to cleave common SNARE substrates of BoNTs.

Antibiotic resistance 
Chryseobacterium spp. are inherently resistant to a wide spectrum of antibiotics, including tetracyclines, erythromycin, linezolid, polymyxins, aminoglycosides, chloramphenicol, and many beta-lactams, while also being intermediately sensitive to vancomycin and clindamycin and vary in their sensitivity to trimethoprim-sulfamethoxazole.

Species 
Species include:

See also 
Bacteroidota
Flavobacteriaceae

References 

 
Flavobacteria
Bacteria genera